Mount Sterling-Montgomery County Airport  is a public use airport located two nautical miles (4 km) west of the central business district of Mount Sterling, a city in Montgomery County, Kentucky, United States. It is owned by the city of Mount Sterling and Montgomery County.

Although most U.S. airports use the same three-letter location identifier for the FAA and IATA, this airport is assigned IOB by the FAA but has no designation from the IATA.

Facilities and aircraft
It has one asphalt paved runway designated 3/21 which measures 5,002 by 75 feet (1,525 x 23 m).

For the 12-month period ending August 7, 2007, the airport had 31,505 aircraft operations, an average of 86 per day: 85% general aviation, 12% air taxi and 2% military. At that time there were 70 aircraft based at this airport: 79% single-engine, 19% multi-engine, 1% jet and 1% helicopter.

References

External links
 Kentucky Airmotive, the fixed-base operator (FBO)
 
 

Airports in Kentucky
Buildings and structures in Montgomery County, Kentucky
Transportation in Montgomery County, Kentucky